The Mariners Centre is a multi-purpose and double ice surface arena in Yarmouth, Nova Scotia, Canada. It is home to the Yarmouth Mariners of the Maritime Junior Hockey League. The facility hosted the 2005 Fred Page Cup and  hosted the New York Islanders training camp in September, 2005 and the Islanders returned for their training camp in 2006 with their new head coach, Ted Nolan. The Mariners Centre hosted the World Junior A Challenge in November 2012 and 2013.

References

External links 
Mariners Centre official site

Indoor arenas in Nova Scotia
Indoor ice hockey venues in Canada
Sports venues in Nova Scotia
Yarmouth, Nova Scotia
Sports venues completed in 2001
2001 establishments in Nova Scotia